Rajasthan Technical University (RTU) is an affiliating university in Kota in the state of Rajasthan, India. It was established in 2006 by the Government of Rajasthan to enhance technical education in the state. It has many affiliated colleges under its umbrella.

RTU is on the campus of the University Engineering College, Kota, previously Engineering College of Kota and now University Teaching Department which is now an autonomous institute.

The university affiliates about 130 engineering colleges, 4 B.Arch colleges, 41 MCA colleges, 95 MBA colleges, 44 M.Tech colleges and 03 hotel management and catering institutes. More than 2.5 lakh students study in the institutes affiliated to the university.

The university offers Bachelor of Technology, Master of Technology, Master of Business Administration, Master of Computer Applications, and Bachelor of Hotel Management and Catering Technology.

Campus

Rajasthan Technical University is on the campus of University Engineering College, Kota (formerly Engineering College, Kota). The lush green campus is at the bank of river Chambal in an area of more than 385 acres.

The campus is on the Rawatbhata Road, about 14 km from Kota Railway Station and 10 km from Kota bus stand.

Organisation and administration

Governance
The Governor of Rajasthan is the chancellor of the university. Santosh Kumar Singh was appointed Vice Chancellor (VC) in August 2022 replacing Ram Avatar Gupta.

Departments
 Aeronautical Engineering
 Ceramic Engineering
 Civil Engineering
 Chemical Engineering
 Computer Science & Engineering
 Electronics & Communication Engineering
 Electrical Engineering
 Electronics Instrumentation & Control Engineering
 Humanities and English Studies
 Information Technology Engineering
 Mathematics
 Mechanical Engineering
 Nano Technology
 Petroleum Engineering
 Petrochemical Engineering
 Production & Industrial Engineering
 Physics Studies
 Management Studies

Academics
RTU is an affiliating university. Its affiliated colleges offer the degrees of Bachelor of Technology (B.Tech), Master of Technology (M.Tech), Master of Business Administration (MBA), Master of Computer Applications (MCA) and Bachelor of Hotel Management and Catering Technology (BHMCT).

, RTU affiliates 202 colleges. B.Tech degrees are offered at nine government aided institutes and 109 are private ones. MBA degrees are offered at seven government aided institutes and 122 are private ones.

MCA degrees are offered in at seven government aided institutes and 25 are private ones. M.Tech is offered in 24 colleges and BHMCT in four colleges. In addition, two colleges offer Bachelor of Architecture (B.Arch) degrees.

References

External links

 

Universities and colleges in Kota, Rajasthan
Universities in Rajasthan
All India Council for Technical Education
Educational institutions established in 2006
2006 establishments in Rajasthan